Bezverkhovo is a village, the administrative center of the Bezverkhovskoye Rural Settlement, part of the Khasansky District of Primorsky Krai, Russia. Population: .

References

Rural localities in Primorsky Krai